Érik Chvojka and Peter Polansky were the defending champions, but Polansky decided not to participate this year. Chvojka partnered with Lukáš Lacko, but lost in the first round to Philip Bester and Brayden Schnur.

Marcus Daniell and Artem Sitak won the title, defeating Jordan Kerr and Fabrice Martin 7–6(7–5), 5–7, [10–5] in the final.

Seeds

Draw

References
Main Draw

Challenger Banque Nationale de Granby
Challenger de Granby